The David Syme House is located in Sycamore, Illinois and is part of the Sycamore Historic District. The district was listed on the National Register of Historic Places in May 1978. The Queen Anne style home was constructed sometime around 1880.

History
David Syme arrived in Sycamore in 1868 and was president of Sycamore National Bank. During his tenure in Sycamore, Syme served as mayor and president of the school board. He often donated time and funds to the Sycamore Public Library, another building within the district. His home was constructed for about $8,000 around 1880. The architect, George O. Garnsey of Chicago, designed the home in the Queen Anne style. Some of the home's features are its two, prominent turrets and stained glass windows.

Notes

Houses completed in 1880
Buildings and structures in Sycamore Historic District
Houses in DeKalb County, Illinois
Houses on the National Register of Historic Places in Illinois
Queen Anne architecture in Illinois
Historic district contributing properties in Illinois
National Register of Historic Places in DeKalb County, Illinois